Somero is a town and municipality of Finland. Somero is unilingually Finnish.

Somero's neighbouring municipalities are Jokioinen, Koski Tl, Lohja, Loimaa, Salo, Tammela and Ypäjä.

History
Somero has been known as a trading place since the 14th century. The municipality was officially founded in 1867. The municipality of Somerniemi merged with Somero proper in 1977. Somero was moved from the province of Häme to the province of Turku and Pori in 1990. Currently it belongs to the province of Western Finland. Somero became a town on January 1, 1993.

Scenery 

Häntälä Hollows are the traditional biotope area in the villages of Häntälä, Talvisilla, Syväoja and Kerkola. The nature trail that begins at the Häntälä Village House is located in the area, where it is possible to explore its traditional landscapes. Häntälä Hollows is part of the wider Natura 2000 area of the Rekijokilaakso, which also extends to the city of Salo. The most significant main roads in Somero are the national road 52 through the town center and the regional road 280 in south of the town center, which is the most direct road connection to Helsinki.

Famous natives
Kaija Aarikka
Karita Mattila
Unto Mononen
Pentti Nikula
M.A. Numminen
Rauli "Badding" Somerjoki
Kaari Utrio

International relations

Twin towns
Somero has six twin cities
 Narva, Estonia
 Otterup
  Tune, Norway
  Vindafjord
  Älvkarleby
  Protvino

References

External links

Municipality of Somero – Official website

 
Cities and towns in Finland
Populated places established in 1867